The Börje Langefors Award (Swedish Börje Langeforspriset) is an annual academic prize awarded since 2011 by the Swedish Information Systems Academy (Svenska informationssystemakademin (SISA)) for the best doctoral dissertation in Sweden in the subject areas - informatics, information systems, data and information science or equivalent. The prize aims to reward and encourage development of high standard research in Sweden, and to demonstrate exemplary research in informatics.

Origin
The award was named after Professor Börje Langefors (1915–2009), one of those who made systems development a science. Langefors was a Swedish engineer and computer scientist, and emeritus professor of business information systems at the Department of Computer and Systems Science, Stockholm University and Royal Institute of Technology, Stockholm. Langefors was a pioneer of IT and one of the initiators of "informatics" as an academic area of study. He was the first IT professor in Sweden and one of the first in the world. Langefors contributed strongly to put Sweden on the international IT map and brought into a focus in particular to the user's role in data processing. Langefors brought more than 20 graduate students to degree most of which today are professors who in turn have brought their students to graduates.

Award criteria
The following quality criteria are applied for the evaluation of individual doctoral thesis:
 Relevance: Articulate, well-defined and well-motivated research question(s)
 Articulate and well-reflected research design
 Comprehensiveness: Chosen and used well described theory base
 Well described empirical base
 Validity of knowledge (empirically and theoretically well-grounded)
 Contribution validity and durability (abstraction) to further research 
 Innovative value in knowledge contributions
 Independence (of author's own contribution) 
 Communicability: Clarity, transparency and conceptual clarity
 Internal coherence: holistic and coherent argument
 Subject (IS field) congruency
 Ability to serve as a "Role model"
 International exposure /review
The awards during 2011-2016 were sponsored by Nethouse and Sitevision.

Prize committee
Every year in spring (usually in May), a prize committee assesses the theses submitted by the universities/institutions in Sweden and nominates the best dissertation, which is finally announced in connection with SISA's annual conference. The members in 2016 were:
 Professor Karin Hedström, Örebro University
 Professor Tero Päivärinta, Luleå University
 Professor Jan Ljungberg, University of Gothenburg
 Professor Jeremy Rose, University of Skövde
 Professor Vivian Vimarlund, Linköping University

Winners

2020 
Daniel Skog, Umeå University 

Leif Sundberg, Mid University Sweden

2019 
Susanne Lindberg, Halmstad University  

Fatemeh Saadatmand, Borås University

2018 
Olgerta Tona from Lund University

2017

2016

2015 
Johan Sandberg, Postdoctoral Researcher at the Umeå University awarded the first best for his doctoral dissertation entitled "Digital Capability: Investigating Coevolution of IT and Business Strategies"

2014 
Mathias Hatakka, Senior Lecturer at the Örebro University awarded the first best for his doctoral dissertation entitled "The capability approach in ict4d research".

2013 
Anders Olof Larsson at the Department of Informatics and Media of Uppsala University for his thesis "Doing Things in Relation to Machines – Studies on Online Interactivity".

The committee stated: "The thesis is based on a socially relevant contemporary topic, well-designed and well-defined subject area with contrasting perspectives based on exceptional and interesting empirical material. The thesis is easy to read and well structured with well linked articles. It has a very good international exposure".

2012 
Henrik Wimelius, assistant professor at the Umeå University awarded the first best for his doctoral dissertation entitled “Duplicate Systems: Investigating Unintended Consequences of Information Technology in Organizations”. 

The committee stated: “Henrik Wimelius dissertation is well written and clearly positioned against existing literature. The question that is addressed both theoretically and practically interesting. Methodologically the research is based on a rigorous process, presented in a reflexive manner. Furthermore, logic and structure of the thesis is well thought. The existence of parallel, competing IT systems in organizations and activities tend to help Henrik with valuable insights and lessons learned. His thesis is an excellent knowledge base which can advantageously be further exploited.”

M Sirajul Islam, Associate Professor at the Örebro University awarded for 'Outstanding doctoral dissertation' entitled “Creating Opportunity by Connecting the Unconnected: Deploying Mobile Phone-based Agriculture Market Information Service for Farmers in Bangladesh”. 

The committee stated: “ Sirajul Islam's dissertation "reports a design-oriented action research project that sought to create sustainable societal effects by facilitating mobile technology adoption. One interesting aspect of this change effort is that it nicely illustrates how informatics research can help underprivileged groups to strengthen their positions through innovative IT use. The research project was executed through a well-designed process that is presented in a comprehensive yet detailed way. In particular, it reveals how and why certain practical and theoretical issues were tackled to push the project forward.  Constituting the core of the thesis, the set of articles suggests that the results produced were not only locally relevant but also globally impactful.” A brief interview about his thesis is available in this link.

2011 
Annika Andersson at the Informatics Department of Örebro University for her thesis "Learning to learn in e-Learning: constructive practices for development". 

The committee stated: "Annika Andersson is awarded the prize for best dissertation for the following reasons: socially relevant subject matter, well formulated and relevant theoretical basis, proper research design with appropriate method triangulation and sequencing of sub-studies, comprehensive and interesting empirical work, good incremental cumulative knowledge, clear and well-structured presentation, good design of compilation thesis with a well-developed cover paper, a good international exposure."

References

External links 

 Homepage (in Swedish)
2011 first - Thesis download link is here.
 2011 second - Thesis download link is here.
 2012 first - Thesis download link is here.
 2012 second best - Thesis download link is here. 
 A brief interview with Sirajul about this Award is available here (in Swedish).
 2013 first - Thesis download link is here.
 Information about this conference can be found here. 

Awards for scholarly publications